Soldiers Point is a suburb of the Port Stephens local government area in the Hunter Region of New South Wales, Australia. Located on the southern shores of Port Stephens it is almost entirely surrounded by the port and is a popular location for fishing and boating. While primarily residential, like other suburbs around Port Stephens, it is a popular tourist destination, especially in summer months.

Soldiers Point was originally the site of a garrison of soldiers that was established in 1820 to hunt down escaped convicts.

In July 2016, the New South Wales government declared  of the suburb as an Aboriginal place, recognising that Soldiers Point was a special place for cultural, spiritual and historic reasons to the Worimi people.

Notes

References

Suburbs of Port Stephens Council